The Jayhawk Radio Network is a network of radio stations in Kansas that divert from their regular programming to broadcast men's football and basketball games of the University of Kansas.  All stations cover the network broadcast, which begins 30 minutes prior to the game and ends approximately 30 minutes after the game, depending on various factors.  Some stations also air the Crimson and Blue Line, a pregame show that begins one hour prior to the network broadcast program and runs until the network pregame begins.

Full Coverage Stations
The following stations carry the Crimson and Blue pregame show in addition to the game broadcast, as well as women's basketball, soccer, softball, baseball, and volleyball, in addition to the major varsity sports of men's basketball and football.
KKSW - FM 105.9, Lawrence, KS (flagship station)
K269GP - FM 101.7, Lawrence, KS
KLWN - AM 1320, Lawrence, KS (flagship station)
KMAJ - AM 1440, Topeka, KS
KGNO - AM 1370, Dodge City, KS